The women's Keirin competition of the cycling events at the 2011 Pan American Games was held on October 20 at the Pan American Velodrome in Guadalajara. This event was not held at the 2007 Pan American Games, therefore there is no defending champion.

Schedule
All times are Central Standard Time (UTC−6).

Results

Final
As there was only seven competitors, a straight final was held without a qualification and repechage round.

References

Track cycling at the 2011 Pan American Games
Women's keirin
Pan